Timothy Eugene Ware (born April 2, 1963) is a former American football wide receiver in the National Football League who played for the San Diego Chargers and Los Angeles Raiders. He played college football for the USC Trojans.

References

1963 births
Living people
American football wide receivers
San Diego Chargers players
Los Angeles Raiders players
USC Trojans football players